Microthelphusa is a genus of crabs in the family Pseudothelphusidae, containing the following species:
 Microthelphusa barinensis Rodríguez, 1980
 Microthelphusa bolivari Rodríguez, 1980
 Microthelphusa forcarti (Pretzmann, 1967)
 Microthelphusa ginesi Rodríguez & Esteves, 1972
 Microthelphusa meansi Cumberlidge, 2007
 Microthelphusa odaelkae (Bott, 1970)
 Microthelphusa racenisi (Rodríguez, 1966)
 Microthelphusa rodriguezi (Pretzmann, 1968)
 Microthelphusa somanni (Bott, 1967)
 Microthelphusa sucreensis Rodríguez & Campos, 2000
 Microthelphusa turumikiri Rodríguez, 1980
 Microthelphusa viloriai Suárez, 2006
 Microthelphusa wymanni (Rathbun, 1905)

References

Pseudothelphusidae